The white-backed night heron (Gorsachius leuconotus) is a species of medium-sized heron in the family Ardeidae, found in sub-Saharan Africa.

Taxonomy
The German naturalist Johann Wagler described the white-backed night heron as Ardea leuconotus in 1827. Today the IOC World Bird List places it in the genus Gorsachius, while BirdLife International and the Handbook of the Birds of the World place it in Calherodius. Its name derives from a patch of white feathers that form a triangle on its back.

Description
The heron has large red eyes with white-ringed markings around them, and the lores, or the region behind the eye, are a pale yellow hue. The throat feathers are white, whereas the neck and breast are rufous, or a reddish-brown hue. There is a notable white triangular patch along the back formed by the white scapulars, or small feathers, on the shoulder of the bird. The belly feathers are a whitish-brown and the legs are yellow. An immature heron can be identified by its streaked breast and the white spots on the upper-wing coverts. Chicks are covered with olive-brown down.

Distribution and habitat
Its primary habitat is dense forests with neighboring waterways, particularly streams, lakes, mangroves and marshes.

Behavior and ecology
The white-backed night heron can be found living individually or in pairs. Nocturnal by nature, they roost in the dense vegetation of marshes and forests during the daylight hours, often nesting high within the trees. Their nests are well-hidden, usually built in vegetation near water and sometimes in reedbeds, mangroves, rocks and caves. They usually breed during the rainy season or early in the dry season. There are two to three greenish-white eggs in a clutch, and incubation lasts roughly 24 to 26 days. The chicks leave the nest after six to seven weeks. The white-backed night heron seems to be sedentary, but it has been observed in some circumstances to have migrated to locations with heavy rain. White-backed night herons are known foragers, meaning they search for food primarily along waterways. They have been observed to eat fish, amphibians, mollusks and insects. Though usually quiet, they let out a loud kroak call when alarmed and a taash call when disturbed.

Status
The population of the white-backed night heron is believed to be stable because it does not appear to undergo significant population declines or experience any notable threats. Due to these factors and its large range, the IUCN Red List has assessed the species to be of least concern. The species is currently experiencing a small number of threats, including habitat loss in southern Africa and hunting in Nigeria, where they are used for traditional medicine.

References

white-backed night heron
Birds of Sub-Saharan Africa
white-backed night heron
Taxonomy articles created by Polbot
Taxobox binomials not recognized by IUCN